The 2014–15 East of Scotland Football League (known for sponsorship reasons as the Central Taxis East of Scotland League) was the 86th season of the East of Scotland Football League, and the 1st season as the sixth tier of the Scottish football pyramid system. The season began on 9 August 2014 and ended on 16 May 2015. Lothian Thistle Hutchison Vale were the defending champions.

The league was split into two separate divisions, the Premier Division and the First Division. This season saw the departure of Edinburgh University who left to join the Lowland Football League.

This was the first season in which the divisions were added to the Scottish league pyramid at levels six and seven. It was proposed that the winner of the Premier Division would compete in a play-off with the winner of the 2014–15 South of Scotland Football League (Wigtown & Bladnoch) for a place in the 2015–16 Lowland Football League, subject to relevant licensing and ground criteria.  As both champions failed to match the valid licensing criteria, no play-off took place and Lothian Thistle Hutchison Vale remained in the division for the following season.

This was the last season of the two-division setup until it returned for the 2019–20 season.

Premier Division

The 2014–15 Premier Division saw a reduction in the number of clubs from ten to nine with fixtures being played over 24 rounds.  The amendment to the number of member clubs was due to the departure of Edinburgh University to the Lowland Football League.  As a result, Civil Service Strollers retained their place in the division despite finishing in the previous season's relegation places.

Following Easthouses Lily's move to junior football at the end of the season, no team was relegated and all Premier Division clubs joined their First Division counterparts to form one division for the 2015–16 season.

Teams

The following teams changed division prior to the 2013–14 season.

To Premier Division
Promoted from First Division
 Easthouses Lily

From Premier Division
Transferred to Lowland Football League
 Edinburgh University
Relegated to First Division
 Heriot-Watt University

League table

First Division

The First Division also saw a reduction in member clubs from ten down to eight, with each team playing 28 fixtures.  The reduction in numbers was caused by the reserve teams of Berwick Rangers and last season's winners Hibernian resigning from the league. After the season all First Division clubs joined their Premier Division counterparts to form one division for 2014–15.

Teams

The following teams changed division prior to the 2013–14 season.

To First Division
Relegated from Premier Division
 Heriot-Watt University

From First Division
Promoted to Premier Division
 Easthouses Lily

League table

References

5